Dobryansky (masculine), Dobryanskaya (feminine), or Dobryanskoye (neuter) may refer to:

People
Andrij Dobriansky (1930–2012), Metropolitan opera singer born in Ukraine
Lev Dobriansky (1918–2008), professor of economics, U.S. ambassador of Ukrainian descent
Paula Dobriansky (born 1955), American foreign policy expert of Ukrainian descent

Places
Dobryansky Municipal District, a municipal formation which the town of krai significance of Dobryanka in Perm Krai, Russia is incorporated as
Dobryanskoye Urban Settlement, a municipal formation in Dobryansky Municipal District of Perm Krai, Russia, which the town of Dobryanka and eight rural localities are incorporated as

See also
Dobrzynski
Dobryanka